Weidman is a surname. Notable people with the surname include:

Charles Weidman (1901–1975), American modern dancer, choreographer and teacher
Chris Weidman (born 1984), American mixed martial artist
Jerome Weidman (1913–1998), Jewish American playwright and novelist
John Weidman, American librettist and staff writer for Sesame Street

See also
Weidman, Michigan
Weideman
Weidmann